Čeněk Dobiáš (June 1, 1919 – September 28, 1980) was a Czech painter. His paintings have different themes, portraits of Roma girls and women, children, colorful fields of flowers etc. From 1949 he was a member of SVU Ales in Brno (Association of Fine Artists), and from 1955 a member of the Association of Czechoslovak Artists.

Literature 
 Pospíšil, Leopold: S kumštýři za oponou, 1. vyd, Nakladatelství Šimon Ryšavý, Brno 2001, 103 s., 8 s. obr. příl., 
 Rudolfová, Věra: Kraj návratů a setkání : medailonky osobností kulturního života Vysočiny, 1. vyd., Sursum, 2006, 160 s.,

See also
List of Czech painters

References

1919 births
1980 deaths
20th-century Czech painters
Czech male painters
Czechoslovak painters
20th-century Czech male artists